The Escapees' Cross 1940–1945 was a Belgian war service medal established on 25 February 1944 by the Belgian government in exile in London.  It was awarded to all Belgian citizens who, during World War II, escaped from occupied Belgium, from another occupied land or from Germany and that, following said escape, had proven their patriotism by joining and serving with a resistance group, or had been imprisoned for a minimum of three months following an act of patriotism, or for having travelled clandestinely to participate in a Belgian action aimed at promoting the war against the enemy.  Escaped prisoners of war could also be awarded the medal if they met this last criteria.

The medal's statute was later amended to include those who had escaped, even from non occupied territories, and made their way to the United Kingdom in order to continue fighting the enemy.  This included the Belgians rescued between 28 May and 2 June 1940 from the beaches of Dunkirk, it also included those who escaped, prior to 1 November 1940, from non occupied France or French North Africa.

Award description
The Escapees' Cross 1940–1945 was a 39mm wide cross pattée with four 7mm long rays radiating outwards between its arms.  Its obverse bore a 14mm wide by 18mm high shield bearing a "lion rampant" superimposed over prison bars.  The medal was single face, its reverse was bare.

The Escapees' Cross 1940–1945 was suspended by a ring through a suspension loop from a 37mm wide green silk moiré ribbon with a longitudinal 6mm wide central black stripe and narrow 3mm black stripes 6mm from the ribbon edges.

Notable recipients (partial list)
The individuals listed below were awarded the Escapees' Cross 1940–1945:
Lieutenant General Roger Dewandre
Lieutenant General Jean-Baptiste Piron
Major General Baron Georges Danloy
Baron Charles Poswick
Baron Gilbert Thibaut de Maisières
Walter Ganshof van der Meersch
Jean-Baptiste Piron
Charles Poswick

See also

 List of Orders, Decorations and Medals of the Kingdom of Belgium

References

Other sources
 Quinot H., 1950, Recueil illustré des décorations belges et congolaises, 4e Edition. (Hasselt)
 Cornet R., 1982, Recueil des dispositions légales et réglementaires régissant les ordres nationaux belges. 2e Ed. N.pl.,  (Brussels)
 Borné A.C., 1985, Distinctions honorifiques de la Belgique, 1830–1985 (Brussels)

External links
Bibliothèque royale de Belgique (In French)
Les Ordres Nationaux Belges (In French)
ARS MORIENDI Notables from Belgian history (In French and Dutch)

1944 establishments in Belgium
Military awards and decorations of Belgium
Civil awards and decorations of Belgium
Awards established in 1944